The 2014 Liga Nusantara North Sulawesi season, also called North Sulawesi League, is the first edition of Liga Nusantara North Sulawesi is a qualifying round of the 2014 Liga Nusantara.

The competition scheduled starts in May 2014.

Teams
This season all registered clubs in North Sulawesi participating.

Result 
Persmin Minahasa is the winner after won 2–1 against PSKT Tomohon in the final.

References 

North Sulawesi